Alan Hampson (31 December 1927 - August 1989) was an English professional footballer who played as an inside forward.

Career
Born in Prescot, Hampson played for Everton, Halifax Town, Bradford City and Prescot Cables.

References

1927 births
1989 deaths
English footballers
Everton F.C. players
Halifax Town A.F.C. players
Bradford City A.F.C. players
Prescot Cables F.C. players
English Football League players
Association football inside forwards